The following is a list of football stadiums in the unrecognized Republic of Artsakh.

See also
List of European stadiums by capacity
List of association football stadiums by capacity

Nagorno-Karabakh
Sport in the Republic of Artsakh
Artsakh
Football stadiums